Carlos de la Mota (October 19, 1975, Concepcion de la Vega, Dominican Republic) is a Dominican architect, actor and singer. His acting career began in 2003 and he received critical acclaim for his role in the telenovela Destilando Amor, as Britishman James O'Brian.

Biography

Early years 
Born in La Vega, in the north of the Dominican Republic. During the early years of his life he lived in New York City (USA) and later in the city of Santo Domingo.

Career 
At 23 de la Mota graduated with a degree in architecture from the "Pontificia Universidad Catolica Madre y Maestra" and found work immediately after graduating working in a government institution. After working for the Dominican government as an architect, he moved to Mexico where he decided to start an acting career while still practicing architecture.

Filmography

Film

Television

Music video

Awards

Other artistic awards

Personal artistic achievements 
First Dominican: to star in the musical Cabaret and do so for two consecutive years in Mexico.
First Dominican: to receive an "Honorary Distinction" by characterization interpretative.
First Dominican: to act in more than 10 Televisa telenovelas.
First Dominican: to stamp their mark on the "Gallery of the Plaza of the Stars" in Mexico.
First Dominican: to assemble and produce a play in Mexico.
First Dominican: to win acting People in Spanish Award.
First Dominican: in cocarrying out first webnovela that transmitted Televisa and Univision by Internet.
First Dominican: to make a tour around Mexico with a play.

References

External links 
 Oficial Página Web de Carlos de la Mota.
 Oficial Twitter de Carlos de la Mota. 
 Oficial Facebook de Carlos de la Mota.
 Biografía de Carlos de la Mota (en esmas.com).
 EcuRed – Biografía de Carlos de la Mota – (EcuRed).
 

Dominican Republic architects
Dominican Republic male film actors
Dominican Republic male telenovela actors
Dominican Republic male television actors
21st-century Dominican Republic male singers
1975 births
Living people
Dominican Republic people of Spanish descent
Pontificia Universidad Católica Madre y Maestra alumni
People from La Vega Province
White Dominicans